Skvernelis Cabinet was the 17th cabinet of Lithuania since 1990. It consisted of the Prime Minister, who is the Head of Government, and 14 government ministers from the Lithuanian Farmers and Greens Union, Social Democratic Labour Party of Lithuania, Electoral Action of Poles in Lithuania – Christian Families Alliance.

History

Farmers and Greens Union and Social Democratic Party coalition 

After the parliamentary elections in 2016, President Dalia Grybauskaitė appointed Saulius Skvernelis, an independent politician who had led the electoral list of Peasants and Greens Union, as the Prime Minister on 22 November 2016. The cabinet received its mandate on 13 December 2016.

On April 22, 2017, the Social Democratic Party of Lithuania elected its new chairman, Gintautas Paluckas. After his election, Gintautas Paluckas stated that he will seek to change coalition agreement made in winter of 2016. By the summer of 2017 the Lithuanian Farmers and Greens Union and the Social Democratic Party of Lithuania disagreements on various issues (most notably on public forest enterprises) became more pronounced. In July, 2017 the Social Democratic Party of Lithuania announced that it will conduct districts branches' opinion polling, which final results came on September 23, 2017.

Majority of the Social Democratic Party of Lithuania districts' branches voted for withdrawal from coalition, but majority of party's parliamentary group members in Seimas (10 members of 17) disagreed with this decision. In return, majority of the party's parliamentary group (12 members of 17 in parliamentary group) formed political groups' coalition with the Lithuanian Farmers and Greens Union. As new coalition lacked members (only 69 members of the parliament were in this coalition), from October 2017 government became minority one.

Farmers and Greens Union and Social Democratic Labour Party coalition 

By the end of 2017, 12 members of 17, which belonged to the Social Democratic Party of Lithuania parliamentary group, formed Social Democratic Labour parliamentary group. On March 24, 2018, this parliamentary group became part of new Social Democratic Labour Party of Lithuania. On April 24, 2018, this party and the Lithuanian Farmers and Greens Union formed an official coalition.

By the summer of 2018, negotiations started between the Lithuanian Farmers and Greens Union, the Social Democratic Labour Party of Lithuania and the Order and Justice considering possible cooperation between them. On September 11, 2018, those parties signed a confidence and supply agreement. On May 29, 2019, Social Democratic Labour Party of Lithuania and Order and Justice chairmen Gediminas Kirkilas and Remigijus Žemaitaitis announced to the public that talks about expanded coalition between these parties and Lithuanian Farmers and Greens Union has started. On June 7, 2019, Electoral Action of Poles in Lithuania – Christian Families Alliance council agreed that party should join these talks, which were concluded on July 5, 2019.

Farmers and Greens Union, Social Democratic Labour Party and Electoral Action of Poles in Lithuania – Christian Families Alliance coalition 

New coalition lasted just for two months as the Order and Justice parliamentary group dissolved itself on September 10, 2019, when majority of the Order and Justice parliamentary group's members founded new parliamentary group called "For the Welfare of Lithuania" (which by itself existed up until mid-January 2020). On September 19, 2019, this parliamentary group signed a confidence and supply agreement with coalition's parties. On October 23, 2019, the Order and Justice had been expelled from coalition. In spring, parliamentary group's "For the Welfare of Lithuania" members joined either Lithuanian Farmers and Greens Union or Social Democratic Labour Party of Lithuania parliamentary groups.

On May 7, 2020, the Christian Union (consisting of 2 former members of the Homeland Union) expressed their support to the government.

As the government was reaffirmed without approval of its programme, Constitutional Court of Lithuania ruled that by this Constitution of Lithuania was breached. However, the ruling would not be officially announced until December 23 in order to allow the government to finish serving its term.

Cabinet

References

External links 
 Website of the Government of the Republic of Lithuania

Cabinet of Lithuania
2016 establishments in Lithuania
Cabinets established in 2016
2020 disestablishments in Lithuania
Cabinets disestablished in 2020